Earthy Love is a 1974 Russian romantic drama film directed by Yevgeny Matveyev and starring Matveyev, Olga Ostroumova, and Yury Yakovlev. The film was a screen adaptation of Pyotr Proskurin's novel  Earthy Love, and was viewed by 50.9 million spectators in 1975.  Yevgeny  Matveyev was honored with the State Prize of the RSFSR for Earthy Love and Destiny.

Plot
A story about love, the late chairman of the collective farm Zakhar Derugin (Yevgeny Matveev) marries the young woman Maria Polivanova (Olga Ostroumova) at the height of the harvest. There is a parallel developing romance between Catherine and her sister Derugin secretary of the District Party Committee Bryukhanov. The film shows the life of the Soviet countryside in the 1930s.

Cast

References

External links

 Earthy Love:Film.Peoples 
Earthy Love: Kino-teatr.ru 

1974 films
Mosfilm films
1970s Russian-language films
1974 romantic drama films
Soviet romantic drama films
Russian romantic drama films
1975 drama films
1975 films